is a  which followed Bun'ei and preceded Kōan. This period spanned the years from April 1275 to February 1278.

Change of era
 1275 : The new era name was created to mark an event or a number of events. The previous era ended and a new one commenced in Bun'ei 12.

Events of the Kenji era
 1275 (Kenji 1): The Mongols sent an ambassador to Kamakura along with the delegation which accompanied the envoy from the Goryeo. The unwelcome visitor was put to death; and his severed head was publicly displayed.
 November 23, 1275 (Kenji 1, 5th day of the 11th month): Hirohito-shinnō was named Crown Prince and heir to his first cousin, the Daikakuji-tō Emperor Go-Uda. This was the result of political maneuvering by Hirohito's father, the Jimyōin-tō Emperor Go-Fukakusa.
 1277 (Kenji 3, 5th month): Yoshimasa laid down his office.

Notes

References
 Ackroyd, Joyce. (1982) Lessons from History: The Tokushi Yoron. Brisbane: University of Queensland Press. ; OCLC 7574544 
 Nussbaum, Louis-Frédéric and Käthe Roth. (2005).  Japan encyclopedia. Cambridge: Harvard University Press. ;  OCLC 58053128
 Titsingh, Isaac. (1834). Nihon Odai Ichiran; ou,  Annales des empereurs du Japon.  Paris: Royal Asiatic Society, Oriental Translation Fund of Great Britain and Ireland. OCLC 5850691
 Varley, H. Paul. (1980). A Chronicle of Gods and Sovereigns: Jinnō Shōtōki of Kitabatake Chikafusa. New York: Columbia University Press. ;  OCLC 6042764

External links
 National Diet Library, "The Japanese Calendar" -- historical overview plus illustrative images from library's collection

Japanese eras
1270s in Japan